Moonlight Mile is a 2002 American romantic drama film written and directed by Brad Silberling. This film was loosely inspired by writer/director Brad Silberling's own experience. He was dating actress Rebecca Schaeffer at the time she was killed by an obsessed fan in 1989.

The film takes its name from the Rolling Stones song of the same name. The film's original title was Baby's in Black, and then later changed to Goodbye Hello, and then the current title. The film is set in 1973 and music from that era is heavily featured, including that of the Rolling Stones, Van Morrison, Bob Dylan, and Elton John.

Plot
Following the murder of Diana Floss in a restaurant in Cape Ann, Massachusetts in 1972, her fiancé Joe Nast elects to stay with her parents. Her father, Ben, is a realtor whose business partner has recently left. Ben and Joe go into business as Floss & Son, as this was their plan before Diana's death. Joe goes to the post office to retrieve all the invitations that had been sent out for his and Diana's wedding, and with the help of Bertie Knox he retrieves seventy-four of seventy-five. She finds the last invitation and takes it to his house later that night. He drops her off at a local bar, and returns home, despite her inviting him in for a drink. Joe and Ben attend a local property fair, and Ben pitches the idea of redeveloping a block in the town to developer Mike Mulcahey. Mulcahey agrees, but they need to get all the tenants to agree.

Diana's friends come around to look through her possessions, much to the consternation of her mother, Jojo. They then take Joe out for a drink at the same bar Bertie went to the previous night. Joe puts "Moonlight Mile" on the jukebox and Bertie dances with him. Joe convinces Ben to let him talk to the bar's owner to convince them to sell. Feeling trapped at the Floss home, he meets Bertie and tells her about Diana. He confesses to her that he had split up with Diana three days before she was killed. Bertie tells Joe about her boyfriend, the owner of the bar, who is lost in Vietnam.

One night Joe sneaks out the window to go see Bertie again. They sleep together, and he leaves the next morning, slipping back into Diana's house through the window. Jojo is sitting in the room, drinking, knowing that he was out seeing another woman, and saddened by the idea that she had always known he would have never ended up with her daughter. She does not want Joe to leave, as they have formed a bond.

Joe goes to dinner at the Mulcahey's, where Mike's wife presumes aloud that Joe was not still tied up with thoughts of his fiancee's murder. Joe states that this is not the case, upsetting the mood at the dinner table. Mike calls Ben and ends their deal.

Bertie confronts Joe about what happened between them, and they have an argument in which he tells her no one believes her boyfriend is coming home and that she deserved better anyway. She leaves, upset.

The family attends the trial of Diana's murderer. However, the murderer's wife elicits sympathy from the jury, and the prosecutor, Mona Camp, asks Joe to testify and help the jury gain sympathy for Diana. While on the witness stand, Joe confesses that he and Diana had broken up prior to her death, and had not told her parents. Ben and Jojo are happy with the confession and gain closure. Joe symbolically writes 75 letters expressing his newfound clarity about what course his life ought to take and his love for Bertie, and places them in mailboxes around town, hoping that one will get to her.

Ben closes the shop, Jojo resumes her writing career, Bertie sells the bar, and she and Joe leave town.

Cast

 Jake Gyllenhaal as Joe Nast
 Dustin Hoffman as Ben Floss
 Susan Sarandon as Jojo Floss
 Ellen Pompeo as Bertie Knox
 Holly Hunter as Mona Camp
 Dabney Coleman as Mike Mulcahey
 Careena Melia as Diana Floss
 Roxanne Hart as June Mulcahey
 Richard T. Jones as Ty
 Alexia Landeau as Cheryl

Reception

Box office
The film grossed $10,011,050 worldwide from a $21,000,000. budget.

Critical reception
Moonlight Mile received mixed reviews from critics. The review aggregator Rotten Tomatoes,   gave the film a 63% approval rating out of 149 reviews. The site's consensus states: "Though the story feels rather contrived, Moonlight Mile is redeemed by the good performances of its cast."

Soundtrack
The Moonlight Mile soundtrack was released September 24, 2002 by Sony Records.

References

External links

 
 
 
 

2002 films
2002 romantic drama films
American romantic drama films
Films directed by Brad Silberling
Films set in 1973
Films shot in California
Films shot in Massachusetts
Hyde Park Entertainment films
Touchstone Pictures films
Films about grieving
Films scored by Mark Isham
Films with screenplays by Brad Silberling
2000s English-language films
2000s American films